Dzari Tragedy, Zar Tragedy, or the Shooting on the Zar road, was a mass murder of ethnic Ossetian refugees by Georgian troops in the administrative territory of Dzari, near the central city of Tskhinvali in Georgia's break-away South Ossetia region. The event took place on 20 May 1992, when a convoy of refugees from South Ossetia was stopped on the road through Dzari by Georgian troops and shot at point-blank from machine guns. According to the sources, 33 to 36 people, mostly children, women and the elderly, were killed as a result of the attack.

References

External links 
 
 

Georgian–Ossetian conflict
May 1992 events
1992 murders in Georgia (country)
1992 in South Ossetia
Mass murder in 1992
Massacres in Georgia (country)
1992 in Georgia (country)